Oreonetes is an extinct genus of oreodont endemic to North America from the Late Eocene 38.0—33.9 Ma living approximately .

Oreonetes was a very small browsing oreodont found in the forest undergrowth in the Western United States during the Late Eocene.

Taxonomy
Oreonetes was named by Loomis (1924). It is not extant. It was assigned to Merycoidodontidae by Loomis (1924) and Lander (1998).

Fossil distribution
Fossils are widespread through the western United States.

Species
O. anceps.

Sister genera
Aclistomycter, Bathygenys, Brachycrus (syn. Pronomotherium), Desmatochoerus, Eporeodon (syn. Hypselochoerus, Pseudodesmatochoerus), Hypsiops (syn. Pseudomesoreodon, Submerycochoerus), Leptauchenia (syn. Brachymeryx, Cyclopidius, Hadroleptauchenia, Pithecistes, Pseudocyclopidius), Limnenetes, Mediochoerus, Merycoides (syn. Paramerychyus), Merycochoerus, Merycoidodon (syn. Blickohyus, Genetochoerus, Oreodon, Otionohyus, Paramerycoidodon, Prodesmatochoerus, Promesoreodon, Subdesmatochoerus), Mesoreodon, Miniochoerus (syn. Parastenopsochoerus, Platyochoerus, Stenopsochoerus), Oreodontoides, Paroreodon (syn. Epigenetochoerus), Phenacocoelus, Sespia (syn. Megasespia), Ticholeptus (syn. Poatrephes).

Resources

 
Eocene even-toed ungulates
Prehistoric mammals of North America
Prehistoric even-toed ungulate genera